Peace enforcement is the use of military force to compel peace in a conflict, generally against the will of combatants. To do this, it generally requires more military force than peacekeeping operations. The United Nations, through its Security Council per Chapter VII of its charter, has the ability to authorize force to enforce its resolutions and ceasefires already created.

Peace enforcement differs from peacekeeping as peace enforcement activities are generally used to create a peace from a broken ceasefire or to enforce a peace demanded by the United Nations. Compared to peacekeeping, peace enforcement requires more military force and is thereby best done by heavily armed forces. However, it is generally unable to create lasting peace, as it does nothing to deal with the underlying problems which caused the conflict itself.

One of the most famous examples of peace enforcement was the UN intervention during the Gulf War to force Saddam Hussein's Iraqi army from Kuwait. The United Nations was thereby able to compel Iraq's compliance with the UN Resolutions which demanded its withdrawal from the region.

A report on peacekeeping and peace enforcement in the 1990s for the United States Army established this difference between peace enforcement and peacekeeping: Peacekeeping, a role the U.N. has played over the years, is relatively straightforward and, despite its difficulties, comparatively easy. Peacekeeping involves monitoring and enforcing a cease-fire agreed to by two or more former combatants. It proceeds in an atmosphere where peace exists and where the former combatants minimally prefer peace to continued war. Peace-enforcement, as it is used by the United States Joint Chiefs of Staff, entails the physical interposition of armed forces to separate ongoing combatants to create a cease-fire that does not exist. Boutros-Ghali, on the other hand, uses the term to refer to actions to keep a cease-fire from being violated or to reinstate a failed cease-fire. It is a subtle difference, but it does imply the existence of some will for peace. The American version more realistically portrays another, far more difficult matter. By definition, in a situation for which peace-enforcement is a potentially appropriate response, war and not peace describes the situation, and one or more of the combatants prefer it that way. This means that, unlike peacekeepers, peace enforcers are often not welcomed by one or either side(s). Rather, they are active fighters who must impose a cease-fire that is opposed by one or both combatants; in the process, the neutrality that distinguishes peacekeepers will most likely be lost.

See also
Pacification
Peacekeeping
Peacemaking
An Agenda for Peace
United Nations Force Intervention Brigade

References

Mohamed Awad Osman, The United Nations and Peace Enforcement, wars, Terrorism and Democracy, Aldershot, Ashgate 2002.
This original work by Dr Osman of London School of Economics (LSE) is a ground-breaking research in the field. It has been reissued by Routledge in 2017-18-19-20-21.

External links
 OPERATIONS OTHER THAN WAR. VOLUME IV "PEACE OPERATIONS"

Military science